Fairview Township is one of eighteen townships in Allamakee County, Iowa, USA.  At the 2010 census, its population was 240.

History
Fairview Township was organized in 1855.

Geography
According to the USGS, it contains three cemeteries: Grover Plot, Ion Methodist and Spaulding.

References

External links
 US-Counties.com
 City-Data.com

Townships in Allamakee County, Iowa
Townships in Iowa
1855 establishments in Iowa
Populated places established in 1855